Mokgadi Caster Semenya OIB (born 7 January 1991) is a South African middle-distance runner and winner of two Olympic gold medals and three World Championships in the women's 800 metres. She first won gold at the World Championships in 2009 and went on to win at the 2016 Olympics and the 2017 World Championships, where she also won a bronze medal in the 1500 metres. After the doping disqualification of Mariya Savinova, she was also awarded gold medals for the 2011 World Championships and the 2012 Olympics.

Semenya is an intersex woman, with 5α-Reductase 2 deficiency, assigned female at birth, with XY chromosomes and naturally elevated testosterone levels. Following her victory at the 2009 World Championships, she was made to undergo sex testing, and cleared to return to competition the following year. In 2019, new World Athletics rules came into force preventing women like Semenya from participating in 400m, 800m, and 1500m events in the female classification unless they take medication to suppress their testosterone levels. In 2021, she filed an appeal with the European Court of Human Rights against the restrictions.

Early life and education
Semenya was born in Ga-Masehlong, a village in South Africa near Polokwane (previously called Pietersburg), and grew up in the village of Fairlie, deep in South Africa's northern Limpopo province. She has three sisters and a brother. Semenya attended Nthema Secondary School and the University of North West as a sports science student. She began running as training for association football.

Career

2008
In July, Semenya participated in the 2008 World Junior Championships in the 800 m and did not qualify for the finals. She won gold at the 2008 Commonwealth Youth Games with a time of 2:04.23.

2009

In the African Junior Championships, Semenya won both the 800 m and 1500 m races with the times of 1:56.72 and 4:08.01, respectively. With that race she improved her 800 m personal best by seven seconds in less than nine months, including four seconds in that race alone. The 800 m time was the world leading time in 2009 at that date. It was also a national record and a championship record. Semenya simultaneously beat the Senior and Junior South African records held by Zelda Pretorius at 1:58.85, and Zola Budd at 2:00.90, respectively.

In August, Semenya won gold in the 800 metres at the World Championships with a time of 1:55.45 in the final, again setting the fastest time of the year.

In December 2009, Track and Field News voted Semenya the Number One Women's 800-metre runner of the year.

Sex verification tests
Following her victory at the world championships, questions were raised about her sex. Having beaten her previous 800 m best by four seconds at the African Junior Championships just a month earlier, her quick improvements came under scrutiny. The combination of her rapid athletic progression and her appearance culminated in World Athletics (formerly called the IAAF) asking her to take a sex verification test to ascertain whether she was female. The IAAF says it was "obliged to investigate" after she made improvements of 25 seconds at 1500 m and eight seconds at 800 m – "the sort of dramatic breakthroughs that usually arouse suspicion of drug use".

The sex test results were never published officially, but some results were leaked in the press and were widely discussed, resulting in at the time unverified claims about Semenya having an intersex trait.

In November 2009, South Africa's sports ministry issued a statement that Semenya had reached an agreement with the IAAF to keep her medal and award. Eight months later, in July 2010, she was cleared again to compete in women's competitions.

Reaction
News that the IAAF requested the test broke three hours before the 2009 World Championships 800 m final. IAAF president Lamine Diack stated, "There was a leak of confidentiality at some point and this led to some insensitive reactions." The IAAF's handling of the case spurred many negative reactions. A number of athletes, including retired sprinter Michael Johnson, criticised the organisation for its response to the incident. There was additional outcry from South Africans, alleging undertones of European racism and imperialism embedded in the gender testing. Many local media reports highlighted these frustrations and challenged the validity of the tests with the belief that through Semenya's testing, members of the Global North did not want South Africans to excel.

The IAAF said it confirmed the requirement for a sex verification test after the news had already been reported in the media, denying charges of racism and expressing regret about "the allegations being made about the reasons for which these tests are being conducted". The federation also explained that the motivation for the test was not suspected cheating but a desire to determine whether she had a "rare medical condition" giving her an "unfair advantage". The president of the IAAF stated that the case could have been handled with more sensitivity.

On 7 September 2009, Wilfred Daniels, Semenya's coach with Athletics South Africa (ASA), resigned because he felt that ASA "did not advise Ms. Semenya properly". He apologised for personally having failed to protect her. ASA President Leonard Chuene admitted on 19 September 2009 to having subjected Semenya to testing. He had previously lied to Semenya about the purpose of the tests and to others about having performed the tests. He ignored a request from ASA team doctor Harold Adams to withdraw Semenya from the World Championships over concerns about the need to keep her medical records confidential.

Prominent South African civic leaders, commentators, politicians, and activists characterised the controversy as racist, as well as an affront to Semenya's privacy and human rights. On the recommendation of South Africa's Minister for Sport and Recreation, Makhenkesi Stofile, Semenya retained the legal firm Dewey & LeBoeuf, acting pro bono, "to make certain that her civil and legal rights and dignity as a person are fully protected". In an interview with South African magazine YOU Semenya stated, "God made me the way I am and I accept myself." Following the furore, Semenya received great support within South Africa, to the extent of being called a cause célèbre.

2010

In March 2010, Semenya was denied the opportunity to compete in the local Yellow Pages Series V Track and Field event in Stellenbosch, South Africa, because the IAAF had yet to release its findings from her sex test.

On 6 July, the IAAF cleared Semenya to return to international competition. The results of the sex tests, however, were not released for privacy reasons. She returned to competition nine days later, winning two minor races in Finland. On 22 August 2010, running on the same track as her World Championship victory, Semenya started slowly but finished strongly, dipping under 2:00 for the first time since the controversy, while winning the ISTAF meet in Berlin.

Not being in full form, she did not enter the World Junior Championships or the African Championships, both held in July 2010, and opted to target the Commonwealth Games to be held in October 2010. She improved her season's best to 1:58.16 at the Notturna di Milano meeting in early September and returned to South Africa to prepare for the Commonwealth Games. Eventually, she was forced to skip the games due to an injury.

2011
After the controversy of the previous year, Semenya returned to action with a moderately low profile, running only 1:58.61 at the Bislett Games as her best prior to the World Championships.  During the championships, she easily won her semi-final heat. In the final, she remained in the front of the pack leading into the final straightaway. While she separated from the rest of the field, Mariya Savinova followed her, then sprinted past Semenya before the finish line, leaving her to finish second.  In 2017, Savinova was banned for doping and her results were disqualified, resulting in Semenya being awarded the gold medal.

2012 Olympics

Caster Semenya was chosen to carry the country's flag during the opening ceremony of the 2012 Summer Olympics. She later won a silver medal in the women's 800 metres of these games, with a time of 1:57.23 seconds, her season's best. She passed six competitors in the last 150 metres, but did not pass world champion Mariya Savinova of Russia, who took gold in a time of 1:56.19, finishing 1.04 seconds before Semenya. During the BBC coverage after the race, former British hurdler Colin Jackson raised the question whether Semenya had thrown the race, as the time that had been run was well within her capability, though in fact Semenya had at that point only once in her life run faster than Savinova's winning time, when winning the 2009 World Championships.

In November 2015, the World Anti-Doping Agency recommended Savinova and four other Russian athletes be given a lifetime ban for doping violations at the Olympics. On 10 February 2017, the Court of Arbitration for Sport (CAS) officially disqualified Savinova's results backdated to July 2010. The International Olympic Committee reallocated the London 2012 medals, and Semenya's silver was upgraded to gold.

2015 testosterone rule change 
The IAAF policy on hyperandrogenism, or high natural levels of testosterone in women, that had been in place since 2011 was suspended following the case of Dutee Chand v. Athletics Federation of India (AFI) & The International Association of Athletics Federations, in the Court of Arbitration for Sport, decided in July 2015. The ruling found that there was a lack of evidence provided that testosterone increased female athletic performance and notified the IAAF that it had two years to provide the evidence.

2016
On 16 April, Semenya became the first person to win all three of the 400 m, 800 m, and 1500 m titles at the South African National Championships, setting world leading marks of 50.74 and 1:58.45 in the first two events, and a 4:10.93 in the 1500 m, all within a nearly four-hour span of each other.

On 16 July, she set a new national record for 800 metres of 1:55:33. On 20 August, she won the gold medal in the women's 800 metres at the Rio Olympics with a time of 1:55.28. The win reignited controversy over the rules on permissible testosterone levels; immediately after the race Lynsey Sharp, finishing sixth, broke into tears, having previously said that "everyone can see it's two separate races", while fifth-placed Joanna Jóźwik stated "I feel like the silver medalist ... I'm glad I'm the first European, the second white", to finish the race. Bioethicist Katrina Karkazis criticised the indignant response to Semenya's win as discriminatory.

Semenya set a new personal best for the 400 m of 50.40 at the 2016 Memorial Van Damme track and field meet in Brussels.

2017
Semenya won the bronze medal in the 1500 metres at the 2017 World Championships held in London. She also won the gold medal in the women's 800m event.

2018 testosterone rule change
In April 2018, the IAAF announced new rules that required athletes who have certain disorders of sex development that cause testosterone levels above 5 nmol/L and androgen sensitivity to take medication to lower their testosterone levels in order to compete in the female classification, effective 8 May 2019. Due to the narrow scope of the changes, which applied to eight different events including the 400m, 800m, and 1500m, which Semenya regularly competes in many people thought the rule change was designed specifically to target Semenya.

In June 2018, Semenya announced that she would legally challenge the IAAF rules. She claimed that such hormonal medication, which she had taken from 2010 to 2015, had made her feel "constantly sick" and caused her abdominal pain. In May 2019, the Court of Arbitration for Sport rejected her challenge, paving the way for the new rules to come into effect. During the challenge, the IAAF clarified that the regulations would only apply to those with the 46,XY karyotype. The legal case divided commentators such as Doriane Coleman, who testified for the IAAF, arguing that women's sport requires certain biological traits, from commentators such as Eric Vilain, who testified for Semenya, arguing that "sex is not defined by one particular parameter ... it's so difficult to exclude women who've always lived their entire lives as women." In July 2019, Semenya said that the ongoing issue had "destroyed" her "mentally and physically".

Semenya appealed the decision to the Federal Supreme Court of Switzerland, who ultimately rejected the appeal in September 2020. The court had provisionally suspended the rules while deciding whether to issue an interlocutory injunction in June, but reversed this decision in July, leaving Semenya unable to compete in the 2019 World Athletics Championships in Doha while her appeal continued.

In February 2021, Semenya filed an appeal with the European Court of Human Rights.

2019 football career
In September 2019, Semenya joined the South African SAFA Sasol Women's League football (soccer) club JVW F.C., owned by Janine van Wyk.

Tokyo 2020 Olympics
In 2020, Semenya announced that she had decided to switch to the 200 meters for the 2020 Tokyo Olympics, in order to avoid the 400 m to one mile ban. In order to qualify for the 200 meters, Semenya would have needed to achieve the qualifying time of 22.80. She had previously won the 5000 m at the South African championship in 2019.

On 15 April 2021, Semenya confirmed she would not try to make the Tokyo 2020 200m qualifying standard. On 28 May 2021, Semenya ran a personal best of 15:32.15 in the 5000m, 22 seconds slower than the necessary speed to compete at the Olympics.

2022 World Championships 

Semenya ran in the 5000 meter race at the 2022 World Athletics Championships in Eugene, Oregon.  It was her first major international competition since 2017.  She finished almost a minute behind first place in her heat of the semifinals, and did not advance to the finals.

Competition record

Personal life and honours
In 2010, the British magazine New Statesman included Semenya in its annual list of "50 People That Matter" for unintentionally instigating "an international and often ill-tempered debate on gender politics, feminism, and race, becoming an inspiration to gender campaigners around the world".

In 2012, Semenya was awarded South African Sportswoman of the Year Award at the SA Sports Awards in Sun City.  Semenya received the bronze Order of Ikhamanga on 27 April 2014, as part of Freedom Day festivities. 

Semenya married her long-term partner, Violet Raseboya, in December 2015. They revealed that Violet Raseboya gave birth to their daughter in 2020.

In October 2016, the IAAF announced that Semenya was shortlisted for women's 2016 World Athlete of the Year.

Semenya was named one of Time magazine's 100 Most Influential People of 2019.

See also
Sex verification in sports
Dutee Chand
Maria José Martínez-Patiño
Santhi Soundarajan
Ewa Klobukowska
Erik Schinegger

References

External links

1991 births
Living people
People from Polokwane
South African female middle-distance runners
Olympic female middle-distance runners
Olympic athletes of South Africa
Olympic gold medalists for South Africa
Olympic gold medalists in athletics (track and field)
Olympic silver medalists in athletics (track and field)
Athletes (track and field) at the 2012 Summer Olympics
Athletes (track and field) at the 2016 Summer Olympics
Medalists at the 2012 Summer Olympics
Medalists at the 2016 Summer Olympics
Commonwealth Games gold medallists for South Africa
Commonwealth Games medallists in athletics
Athletes (track and field) at the 2018 Commonwealth Games
African Games gold medalists for South Africa
African Games medalists in athletics (track and field)
Athletes (track and field) at the 2015 African Games
World Athletics Championships athletes for South Africa
World Athletics Championships medalists
Recipients of the Order of Ikhamanga
Sex verification in sports
University of Pretoria alumni
Northern Sotho people
South African LGBT sportspeople
LGBT track and field athletes
Intersex women
Intersex sportspeople
Track & Field News Athlete of the Year winners
Lesbian sportswomen
World Athletics Championships winners
South African women's soccer players
LGBT association football players
African Championships in Athletics winners
IAAF Continental Cup winners
Diamond League winners
South African Athletics Championships winners
Commonwealth Games gold medallists in athletics
Sportspeople from Limpopo
21st-century South African LGBT people
Women's association footballers not categorized by position
Medallists at the 2018 Commonwealth Games